Sanjiang is a town of Daozhen Gelao and Miao Autonomous County, in northern Guizhou province, China, located  south-southwest of the county seat. , it has four villages under its administration.

Administrative division
As of 2016, the town is divided into four villages: 
 Sanjiang
 Yunfeng
 Qunxin
 Qunle

Geography
The town is situated at southern Daozhen Gelao and Miao Autonomous County. It borders Shangba Tujia Ethnic Township in the northeast, Pingmu Town in the northwest, Longxing Town in the east, and Zheng'an County in the west and south.

Economy
The principal industries in the town are agriculture, forestry and mineral resources. Commercial crops include peach and orange. The region abounds with coal, iron and asbestos.

Tourist attractions
The Fairy Cave is a popular attraction in the town.

The Dreamland Stone Forest is a well known tourist spot, famous for its strange stones.

Transportation
The G69 Yinchuan–Baise Expressway passes across the town north to south.

References

Bibliography

Towns of Zunyi